Several special routes of U.S. Route 6 (US 6) exist. In order from west to east, these special routes are as follows.

Ely business route

Ely spur route

Colton–Castle Gate temporary route

Helper business loop

U.S. Route 6 Business (US-6 Bus.) is a short highway serving the downtown areas of Helper, Utah. The route begins at an at-grade intersection with US-6/US-191 southwest of Helper and proceeds east on Poplar Street to Main Street; this portion is cosigned with State Route 157 (SR-157). The route turns north onto Main Street, passing through downtown Helper. After curving to the northwest and again to the west, the route ends at a diamond interchange (exit 232) on US-6/US-191.

Price business loop

SR-55 is cosigned with the route.

Cisco business route

Grand Junction bypass route

Hastings business loop

U.S. Highway 6 Business (US 6 Bus.) runs for approximately  through Hastings, Nebraska, north of mainline US 6. It crosses US 34 downtown, before that route turns west to run concurrently with US 6.

Lincoln business route

Lincoln city route

Des Moines city route 1

Des Moines city route 2

Davenport business route

Davenport city route

Moline–Joliet temporary route

Lansing–Lake Station business loop

U.S. Route 6 Business (US 6 Bus.) followed along Ridge Road, the former alignment of US 6 before the route was moved to the Borman Expressway which also carried Interstate 80 (I-80) and I-94 and half of US 41 through the cities and towns of Northwest Indiana. The route began in Lansing, Illinois, and heads east across the state line into Munster, Indiana, and traveled through Highland, Griffith, the southern part of Gary, and Hobart (where the road was marked as 37th Avenue). The route ended in Hobart at the intersection of US 6, State Road 51 (SR 51), and SR 130.

Bremen business route

Napoleon business route

U.S. Route 6 Business (US 6 Bus.) runs along State Route 108 (SR 108) and SR 110 in Napoleon, Ohio.

Major intersections

Sandusky–Huron alternate route

Western Greater Cleveland alternate route

U.S. Route 6 Alternate (US 6 Alt.) is an east–west alternate route of US 6 located in Greater Cleveland, traveling . Its western terminus is at US 6 in Rocky River, Ohio, just west of the Rocky River, overlapping US 6's connection with SR 2; its eastern terminus is just west of the Cuyahoga River in the Ohio City neighborhood of Cleveland. US 20 and SR 113 travel concurrent with US 6 Alt. for  while they cross the Rocky River. Nearly all of its  span follows Detroit Avenue's alignment through Lakewood and Cleveland, which also carried US 20 Alt. for a time. The far western portion in Rocky River follows Detroit and Old Lake roads.

US 6 Alt. exists to provide a route for truck traffic, as commercial vehicles are prohibited on Clifton Boulevard.

Eastern Greater Cleveland alternate route

U.S. Route 6 Alternate (US 6 Alt.) traveled along Euclid Avenue, with US 20 Alt., in Cleveland and East Cleveland, Ohio, from 1936 until 1967, when US 20 was removed from US 6 and routed along Euclid Avenue from Superior Avenue in East Cleveland to Public Square in Cleveland.

Euclid–Chardon alternate route

Union City bypass route

Warren business loop

U.S. Route 6 Business (US 6 Bus.) is a  loop through the city center of Warren, Pennsylvania. In 1989, a freeway bypass for US 6 was completed on the south side of the Allegheny River, while the original routing plus a connecting bridge were designated as a business loop. Except for following Ludlow Street near its western terimus, the route mostly follows Pennsylvania Avenue. It is cosigned with US 62 for the westernmost  of its route.

Major intersections

Tunkhannock business loop

U.S. Route 6 Business (US 6 Bus.) is a  loop through the borough of Tunkhannock, Pennsylvania. The route was signed in 2000, as a wider (but still two-lane) bypass was constructed along the Susquehanna River to avoid the narrow old alignment. The business loop, also known as Tioga Street, is the main artery of the town.

Major intersections

Lackawanna County business loop

U.S. Route 6 Business (US 6 Bus.) is a  loop through northern suburbs of the city of Scranton, Pennsylvania. The route was formed in 1999, after a freeway bypass was constructed. The route begins as a four-lane undivided highway, featuring a variety of businesses but avoiding the centers of suburbs like Dickson City and Blakely. It then becomes a two-lane route and skirts north of the narrow suburban finger by traveling through Archbald Pothole State Park and Pennsylvania forestry land. Upon entering Carbondale, the route dips south back into suburban development and serves as a narrow two-lane street for the remainder of its route.

Major intersections

Highlands truck route

U.S. Route 6 Truck (US 6 Truck) is a  truck route of US 6 in eastern Orange County, New York. It begins at the trumpet interchange with US 6 and New York State Route 293 (NY 293) in Woodbury near Harriman State Park, and the route follows NY 293. Here, NY 293 ends, and US 6 Truck starts its concurrency with US 9W, heading south. From there, the two routes run concurrently until the Bear Mountain Circle, where the route rejoins US 6 and meets US 202, in Highlands near Bear Mountain State Park. The route serves as a bypass for the segment of US 6 known as the Long Mountain Parkway, which is limited to passenger cars only.  

Major intersections

Garrison alternate route

U.S. Route 6 Alternate (US 6 Alt.; concurrent with US 202 Alt. for its entire length) is a  alternate route of US 6 and US 202 in southern Putnam County and northern Westchester County, New York. It begins where US 6 and US 202 meet NY 9D at the eastern foot of the Bear Mountain Bridge and follows NY 9D north to NY 403 in Garrison. From there, it heads south on NY 403 and US 9 to rejoin US 6 and US 202 at the traffic circle north of Peekskill. The route serves as a bypass of the segment of US 6 and US 202 known as Bear Mountain Bridge Road, a sharply winding route along the Hudson River. This bypass is an important route for commercial vehicles which cannot traverse Bear Mountain Bridge Road, though they are permitted to do so.

Major intersections

Newtown–Southbury alternate route

U.S. Route 6A (US 6A) between Newtown and Southbury, Connecticut, was the original surface routing of US 6 before the formation of expressway that later became I-84; currently Route 816.

Plymouth–Hartford alternate route

U.S. Route 6A (US 6A) between Plymouth and Hartford, Connecticut, is currently US 6. At this time, the old US 6 went along Route 64 to downtown Waterbury then along Route 10 to Farmington.

Woodbury–Willimantic alternate route

U.S. Route 6A (US 6A) originally connected Woodbury to Willimantic, Connecticut. West of Meriden, this was the original alignment of US 6. When US 6 was reassigned to the former US 6A from Plymouth to Farmington, this became US 6A. This US 6A was subsequently extended through Meriden to Willimantic along modern Route 66. An expressway upgrade was planned for this US 6A. Only a portion of the highway was built and is now I-691.

Coventry–Windham alternate route

U.S. Route 6A (US 6A) between Coventry and Windham, Connecticut, was designated when New England Route 3 (Route 3) was deleted. The route was swapped with the old US 6 in 1939 and finally deleted in 1942 when US 6A became Route 31.

Danielson alternate route

U.S. Route 6A (US 6A) in Danielson, Connecticut, was the old routing of US 6 prior to construction of the two-lane freeway.

Scituate business/bypass routes

In Scituate, Rhode Island, US 6 splits into U.S. Route 6 Business (US 6 Bus.) and U.S. Route 6 Bypass (US 6 Byp.), with mainline US 6 following US 6 Byp. The business alignment travels further south along the old turnpike and is mostly signed as US 6 without a banner. The route is also known as Danielson Pike for its entirety. The bypass is signed mostly as US 6 Byp. on sign assemblies but as bannerless US 6 on green guide signs. Most maps and information takes US 6 along the bypass. 

The business and bypass cross Route 102 soon after splitting. The western half of the bypass is a two-lane limited-access road, with one grade separation, under Gleaner Chapel Road, and one intersection, at Route 102. This newer section ends as it merges with Route 101, once the Rhode Island and Connecticut Turnpike, and now called Hartford Pike. The two parallel alignments cross the Scituate Reservoir and Route 116 before they merge near the east edge of Scituate. This merge was the east end of the Foster and Scituate Turnpike and was the east end of Route 101 until the early 2000s (when it was truncated to the merge with US 6 Byp.). The Rhode Island and Connecticut Turnpike continued to the Olneyville section of Providence, where it is known as Hartford Avenue.

Major intersections

Johnston–Providence alternate route

U.S. Route 6A (US 6A) is an alternate route of US 6 in Rhode Island. The route begins at US 6 and I-295 in Johnston and follows Hartford Avenue  through the city. US 6A continues into Providence, traveling  along Hartford Avenue to its terminus at US 6.

US 6A previously carried mainline US 6 until 1991, when the US 6 designation was moved to the Dennis J. Roberts Expressway replacing the expressway's previous designation of Route 195.

Major intersections

Johnston bypass route

Marion–Wareham temporary route

Cape Cod Canal bypass route

U.S. Route 6 Bypass (US 6 Byp.) was signed along both sides of the Cape Cod Canal in Massachusetts opposite of mainline US 6, which also ran along both sides of the canal along two-way roads. At the eastern terminus of Route 25, US 6 eastbound once crossed the Cape Cod Canal via the Bourne Bridge then followed Sandwich Road along the south side of the canal to the Sagamore Bridge where it joined the Mid-Cape Highway on its way to Provincetown. US 6 westbound would leave the Mid-Cape Highway and cross the Sagamore Bridge then followed the Scenic Highway along the north side of the canal back to the Bourne Bridge. The opposite directions of those two roads were signed as US 6 Byp. (such that the eastbound bypass route was on the north side of the canal while the westbound was along the south side).

Today, both directions of US 6 travels only along the north side of the canal along Scenic Highway. Sandwich Road is now signed "TO 6" from the Sagamore Bridge to the Bourne Bridge, although a single US 6 Byp. sign still exists along Sandwich Road just north of the Bourne Bridge rotary.

South Dennis–East Dennis temporary route

Harwich–Brewster temporary route

References

 

06
U.S. Route 6
U.S. Highways in Utah
U.S. Highways in Indiana
U.S. Highways in Ohio
U.S. Highways in Pennsylvania
U.S. Highways in New York (state)
U.S. Highways in Connecticut
U.S. Highways in Rhode Island
U.S. Highways in Massachusetts